Feel This is the third album by the Jeff Healey Band, released in 1992.

Critical reception

The Toronto Star noted that "the biggest drawback is the weak songwriting, including Tom Petty's contribution, 'Lost In Your Eyes'." The Gazette deemed the album Healey's "most professional set of lowest-common-denominator hard rock yet."

Track listing

Personnel 
The Jeff Healey Band
 Jeff Healey – guitars, lead vocals
 Joe Rockman – bass guitar, backing vocals (3)
 Tom Stephen – drums, backing vocals (3)

Additional Musicians
 Paul Shaffer – keyboards (1, 3, 4, 7, 9, 11-14)
 Washington Savage – keyboards (2, 5, 6, 7, 10)
 Joe Hardy – additional keyboards, additional percussion
 Richard Chycki – handclaps (7), dobro (8)
 Sharron Robert – handclaps (7)
 Patricia Worrall – handclaps (7)
 Dawn Zeeman – handclaps (7)
 Mischke Butler – backing vocals (1, 2, 4, 8, 9, 10, 12, 14)
 Molly Johnson – backing vocals (2, 4, 10, 12)
 Jimi Jamison – backing vocals (3, 4, 7, 8, 9, 11, 12, 13)
 Amanda Marshall – backing vocals (3, 7, 8, 9, 11, 13)
 Warren "Wiggy" Toll – backing vocals (3), handclaps (7)
 Jr. John – rap (10)

Production 
 The Jeff Healey Band – producers
 Joe Hardy – producer, engineer, mixing
 Richard Chycki – assistant engineer
 Brett Zilahi – assistant engineer
 David "Doomsday" Stinson – mix assistant
 George Marino – mastering
 Mitchell Cohen – A&R
 Tom Stephen – art direction, design
 Hugh Syme – art direction, design
 Jeff Katz – photography
 Studios
 Recorded at Forte Sound Studios (Toronto, Canada).
 Mixed at Sounds Interchanged (Toronto, Canada).
 Mastered at Sterling Sound (New York City, New York, USA).

Chart positions and certifications

Album

Singles

Certifications

References 

The Jeff Healey Band albums
1992 albums
Arista Records albums